Omor Faruk Chowdhury (born 2 January 1960) is a Bangladesh Awami League politician and the incumbent Jatiya Sangsad member representing the Rajshahi-1 constituency. He served as a state minister of industries from September 2012 until January 2014.

Education and career
Chowdhury has a LLB degree.

Chowdhury was elected to the parliament from Rajshahi-1 in 2008 and on 5 January 2014 as a Bangladesh Awami League candidate. He was sent a show cause notice by the Bangladesh Election Commission in April 2016 for violating electoral code by supporting candidates in local elections. He is a former State Minister of Industries.

On 15 January 2018, Chowdhury was accused by a Prothom Alo report of being involved in a drug trade. He denied the allegations in a rejoinder to the Prothom Alo. The Prothom Alo replied the report was based on a report by the Ministry of Home Affairs on the drug trade in Rajshahi.

On 27 February 2019, the Election Commission ordered Chowdhury to leave an upazila electoral zone in Rajshahi for violating rules.

Controversy
He has been accused of beating and injuring a college principal named Selim Reza on 7 July. Though MP Omar Farooq Chowdhury denied the allegations against him, saying Selim Reza was injured in an internal clash. According to college sources, the principal alongside eight of his colleagues went to the MP's office to settle a matter regarding a conversation between a college professor's wife and a politician. During conversation, the MP started beating the college principal with a stick, said witnesses

References

Living people
1960 births
Awami League politicians
9th Jatiya Sangsad members
10th Jatiya Sangsad members
11th Jatiya Sangsad members
State Ministers of Industries
Place of birth missing (living people)